The  is a prestigious honor conferred to two of the recipients of the Japan Academy Prize.

Overviews 
It is awarded in two categories: humanities and natural sciences. The Emperor and Empress visit the awarding ceremony and present a vase to the awardees.

Laureates

 2019 — Makoto Fujita (109th)
 2018 — , Chikashi Toyoshima (108th)
 2017 —  (107th)
 2016 — Kazutoshi Mori (106th)
 2015 — Hideo Hosono
 2014 — Isamu Akasaki
 2013 — , Yoshinori Tokura
 2012 — , Keiichi Namba 
 2011 — ,  (101st)
 2010 — , Shinya Yamanaka (100th)
 2009 — ,  (99th)
 2008 —  (98th)
 2007 — , Shizuo Akira (97th)
 2006 — Shuh Narumiya (96th)
 2005 — Kazuya Kato (95th)
 2004 — , Takeshi Yasumoto (94th)
 2003 — Mitsuhiro Yanagida (93rd)
 2002 — , Sumio Iijima (92nd)
 2001 — Fumio Hayashi, Makoto Asashima (91st)
 2000 — , Shigekazu Nagata (90th)
 1999 — , Yoshito Kishi (89th)
 1998 — Toshio Yanagida (88th)
 1997 — Shigetada Nakanishi (87th)
 1996 — Tasuku Honjo (86th)
 1995 — ,  (85th)
 1994 — Makoto Kumada, Hideki Sakurai (84th)
 1993 — Issei Tanaka, Yasuo Tanaka (83rd)
 1992 — , Tadamitsu Kishimoto (82nd)
 1991 — , Akira Tonomura (81st)
 1990 — Koji Nakanishi (80th)
 1989 — ,  (79th)
 1988 —  (78th)
 1987 — , Toshimitsu Yamazaki (77th)
 1986 — Masao Ito (76th)
 1985 — Ryo Sato (75th)
 1984 — , Gakuzo Tamura (74th)
 1983 — Teruaki Mukaiyama (73rd)
 1982 — , Shizuo Kakutani (72nd)
 1981 — Yasuiti Nagano (71st)
 1980 —  (70th)
 1979 — Yoshihide Kozai (69th)
 1978 — Kiyoshi Itō (68th)
 1977 —  (67th)
 1976 — Takashi Sugimura (66th)
 1975 — ,  (65th)
 1974 — , Kimishige Ishizaka (64th)
 1973 — , Jun Kondo (63rd)
 1972 — , Setsuro Ebashi (62nd)
 1971 — , Chushiro Hayashi (61st)
 1970 — ,  (60th)
 1969 — Ryogo Kubo (59th)
 1968 — Tatsuo Nishida (58th)
 1967 — Kōsaku Yosida (57th)
 1966 —  (56th)
 1965 —  (55th)
 1964 — Kiyoshi Mutō (54th)
 1963 —  (53rd)
 1962 — Tomoichi Sasabuchi (52nd)
 1961 —  (51st)
 1960 — , Takuji Ito, Aki Uyeno, Taka Yanagisawa,  (50th)
 1959 — Isao Imai (49th)
 1958 —  (48th)
 1957 — Hajime Nakamura (47th)
 1956 — Masuzo Shikata, Isamu Tachi (46th)
 1955 — Yoshio Fujita (45th)
 1954 — ,  (44th)
 1953 — Tomizo Yoshida (43rd)
 1952 — ,  (42nd)
 1951 — Yoshiyuki Toyama (41st)
 1950 — Shoichi Sakata (40th)
 1949 —  (39th)
 1948 — Saburo Ienaga (38th)
 1947 —  (37th)
 1946 — Hakaru Masumoto (36th) 	
 1945 — Tokuhichi Mishima,  (35th)
 1944 —  (34th)
 1942 —  (32nd)
 1941 — , Kinjiro Okabe,  (31st)
 1940 — , Hideki Yukawa,  (30th)
 1939 — ,  (29th)
 1938 — No award (28th)
 1937 — , Yasujiro Niwa (27th)
 1936 — , Takaoki Sasaki, Tomizo Yoshida (26th)
 1935 — Shimpei Ogura,  (25th)
 1934 — Noboru Niida,  (24th)
 1933 — , Bunsuke Suzuki (23rd)
 1932 — Kyōsuke Kindaichi, Kiyoo Wadati (22nd)
 1931 — Katsutada Sezawa (21st)
 1930 —  (20th)
 1929 —  (19th)
 1928 — , Sōichi Kakeya (18th)
 1927 — ,  (17th)
 1926 — , Yoshiaki Ozawa (16th)
 1925 — ,  (15th)
 1924 — , Takaoki Sasaki (14th)
 1923 — Iichiro Tokutomi, Shigematsu Kakimura, Yasuhiko Asahina, Suekichi Kinoshita (13th)
 1922 — Toshio Takamine,  (12th)
 1921 — , Gennosuke Fuse (11th)
 1920 — , Mitsumaru Tsujimoto (10th)
 1919 — Jun Ishiwara (9th)
 1917 — Torahiko Terada, Sasaki Nobutsuna (7th)
 1915 — Hideyo Noguchi (5th)
 1914 — Sunao Tawara (4th)
 1913 — , Kumakatsu Kosaka (3rd)
 1911 — Hisashi Kimura (1st)

Notes

References
 Kita, Atsushi. (2005).  Dr. Noguchi's Journey: A Life of Medical Search and Discovery (tr., Peter Durfee). Tokyo: Kodansha.

External links
 The Japan Academy 

Humanities awards
1947 establishments in Japan
1911 establishments in Japan
Japan Academy
Japanese science and technology awards